Freedom is an American science fiction television series that aired on the UPN network from October 27 to December 22, 2000. There were 13 episodes filmed, including the original pilot, but only 9 episodes were aired in the United States.

Plot
After war breaks out in the Middle East, combined with an economic downturn that causes mass unemployment and homelessness in America, the President of the United States travels extensively to resolve the matter but Air Force One crashes and the President is presumed dead. The United States is taken over by the US military in what becomes an invisible coup, and the faction label themselves the "Regime". Four military personnel, from different sections of the uniformed services are arrested for unknown charges - one later reveals he was ordered to assassinate the President and refused, resulting in false charges being brought against him - and remanded to prison, where they are later freed by unknown rebels. The four join up with a wider resistance movement against the military government in order to restore the Constitution and bring freedom back to the people.

Cast 
Holt McCallany as Owen Decker
Scarlett Chorvat as Becca Shaw
Bodhi Elfman as Londo Pearl
Darius McCrary as James Barrett
Georg Stanford Brown as Walter Young
James Morrison as Colonel Tim Devon
Françoise Yip as Jin
Nigel Johnson as Billy

Production 
The original pilot was reshot with the eventual series cast.

Episodes

Broadcast 
The episodes that were unaired in the United States aired internationally, and the full series is still occasionally broadcast in Brazil. Sci-Fi Channel began airing reruns of the show in 2006. The unaired episodes would be aired for the first time in America in 2008.

References

External links 
 
 

2000s American science fiction television series
Military science fiction
2000 American television series debuts
2000 American television series endings
Television series by Warner Bros. Television Studios
Dystopian television series
UPN original programming